John Jagger is a Canadian retired ice hockey defenseman who was the first All-American for Wisconsin.

Career
Jagger was recruited to Wisconsin after winning the NOJHL championship in 1967. After a year with the freshman team, Jagger joined the varsity club in 1968 and helped the team to a 22-win season. Jagger led the team's defense with 39 points and was a rising star for the Badgers as the team transitioned into the WCHA. In the team's first season of conference play, Jagger's point total dropped significantly, declining to just 16, but he was instrumental in leading Wisconsin to a 4th-place finish in the conference and was named as the program's first All-American in 1970. That same year Wisconsin shocked college hockey by defeating two-time defending national champion Denver in the conference tournament and earned the Badgers' first bid to the NCAA Tournament. Wisconsin nearly pulled off a second upset when they led undefeated Cornell at the start of the third period but a pair of goals allowed the Big Red to escape.

As a senior, Jagger's scoring returned to the level he achieved as a sophomore and Wisconsin rose to third in the conference, however, the Badgers lost in the first round of the conference tournament and Jagger's college career was over. After graduating Jagger played two seasons of professional and senior hockey before retiring.

Statistics

Regular season and playoffs

Awards and honors

References

External links

1948 births
Living people
Canadian ice hockey defencemen
Ice hockey people from Ontario
Sportspeople from Sault Ste. Marie, Ontario
Sault Ste. Marie Greyhounds players
Wisconsin Badgers men's ice hockey players
Suncoast Suns (EHL) players
AHCA Division I men's ice hockey All-Americans